Berthold of Schweinfurt (died 15 January 980) was a German nobleman.

Life 
He was first mentioned as a Count in 941. In 960, he was mentioned as Count in the Radenzgau. In 961, he appears as count on the lower Raab and in 973 as count in the Volkfeld shire. After successful battles in Bohemia and Hungary, he was named as Margrave in 976. In 980, he appears as count in eastern Franconia.

His background is disputed. The most likely theory is that he was a son (or grandson) of Arnulf, Duke of Bavaria. That would make him a member of the Luitpolding dynasty. Another theory sees him as the son of Arnulf's brother Berthold, Duke of Bavaria, which would still make him out to be a Luitpolding. This linkage with the Luitpoldings would explain the Schweinfurts' connection with Bavaria. Yet another theory puts him into the Popponids family. It is certain that his brother, or nephew, Leopold I, Margrave of Austria was the founder of the Austrian House of Babenberg. The name 'Leopold' is a modernization of 'Luitpold', and would strengthen the argument for ties with the Luitpoldingers.

The  Bertholdus who was mentioned in 941, was tasked by Emperor Otto I with guarding Lothar II, Count of Walbeck, who had been taken prisoner. Lothar was pardoned the following year, and Berthold married his daughter Eilika (d. 19 August 1015). She later initiated the construction of the minster in Schweinfurt, where she was buried.

In 964, Berthold was tasked by Otto with guarding another prisoner, King Berengar II of Italy, who was kept prisoner in Bamberg. In 973, Berthold participated in the ousting of the rebellious Henry II, Duke of Bavaria.

Marriage and issue 
Berthold was married to Eilika of Walbeck, daughter of Lothar II, Count of Walbeck. They had at least two children:
 Henry of Schweinfurt (d. 18 September 1017), who was Berthold's heir
 Bucco, who was mentioned in 1003
 Possibly a Daughter named Hedwig, Mother of Cunigunde of Luxembourg 
In 1010, a lady named Eilika was abbess of Niedernburg Abbey in Passau. It is thought this Eilika may have been a daughter of Berthold and his wife.

References

Counts of Germany
Year of birth unknown
980 deaths
10th-century German nobility